In the theory of ordinary differential equations (ODEs), Lyapunov functions, named after Aleksandr Lyapunov, are scalar functions that may be used to prove the stability of an equilibrium of an ODE.  Lyapunov functions (also called Lyapunov’s second method for stability) are important to stability theory of dynamical systems and control theory. A similar concept appears in the theory of general state space Markov chains, usually under the name Foster–Lyapunov functions.

For certain classes of ODEs, the existence of Lyapunov functions is a necessary and sufficient condition for stability. Whereas there is no general technique for constructing Lyapunov functions for ODEs, in many specific cases the construction of Lyapunov functions is known. For instance, quadratic functions suffice for systems with one state; the solution of a particular linear matrix inequality provides Lyapunov functions for linear systems; and conservation laws can often be used to construct Lyapunov functions for physical systems.

Definition 
A Lyapunov function for an autonomous dynamical system

Further discussion of the terms arising in the definition
Lyapunov functions arise in the study of equilibrium points of dynamical systems. In  an arbitrary autonomous dynamical system can be written as

for some smooth 

An equilibrium point is a point  such that  Given an equilibrium point,  there always exists a coordinate transformation  such that:

By the chain rule, for any function,  the time derivative of the function evaluated along a solution of the dynamical system is

A function  is defined to be locally positive-definite function (in the sense of dynamical systems) if both  and there is a neighborhood of the origin, such that:

Basic Lyapunov theorems for autonomous systems

Let  be an equilibrium of the autonomous system

and use the notation  to denote the time derivative of the Lyapunov-candidate-function :

Locally asymptotically stable equilibrium
If the equilibrium is isolated, the Lyapunov-candidate-function  is locally positive definite, and the time derivative of the Lyapunov-candidate-function is locally negative definite:

for some neighborhood  of origin then the equilibrium is proven to be locally asymptotically stable.

Stable equilibrium
If  is a Lyapunov function, then the equilibrium is Lyapunov stable. The converse is also true, and was proved by J. L. Massera.

Globally asymptotically stable equilibrium
If the Lyapunov-candidate-function  is globally positive definite, radially unbounded, the equilibrium isolated and the time derivative of the Lyapunov-candidate-function is globally negative definite:

then the equilibrium is proven to be globally asymptotically stable.

The Lyapunov-candidate function  is radially unbounded if

(This is also referred to as norm-coercivity.)

Example
Consider the following differential equation on :

Considering that  is always positive around the origin it is a natural candidate to be a Lyapunov function to help us study . Then,

This correctly shows that the above differential equation,  is asymptotically stable about the origin. Note that using the same Lyapunov candidate one can show that the equilibrium is also globally asymptotically stable.

See also
 Lyapunov stability
 Ordinary differential equations
 Control-Lyapunov function
 Chetaev function
 Foster's theorem
 Lyapunov optimization

References

External links
 Example of determining the stability of the equilibrium solution of a system of ODEs with a Lyapunov function

Stability theory